Maksim Sergeyevich Kreisman (born 14 November 1976) is a former Russian professional footballer.

Club career
He made his debut in the Russian Premier League in 2002 for FC Shinnik Yaroslavl.

References

1976 births
Living people
Russian footballers
Association football midfielders
FC Shinnik Yaroslavl players
Russian Premier League players
FC Oryol players
FC Chita players